Alcatraz Island is a 1937 American drama film directed by William C. McGann and written by Crane Wilbur. The film stars John Litel, Ann Sheridan, Mary Maguire, Gordon Oliver, Dick Purcell and Ben Welden. The film was released by Warner Bros. on November 6, 1937.

Plot

Cast

Reception
Frank Nugent of The New York Times said, "This rough-and-ready outline may not convey it, but the film has a compact plot, smooth performances by John Litel and the little-known others, and a good bit of interesting material on the present residence of Al Capone. Whether the Alcatraz scenes are accurate or not is beside the point; they do make good watching. And so, for all its Class B-ishness, does the picture."

References

External links
 
 
 
 

1937 films
Warner Bros. films
American drama films
1937 drama films
Films directed by William C. McGann
American black-and-white films
1930s English-language films
1930s American films